The Girl in the Blue Bra is the name given to an image of an Egyptian woman who participated in the Tahrir Square protests in opposition to Egypt's Supreme Council of the Armed Forces (SCAF), the military coup that ousted Hosni Mubarak during the 2011 Egyptian Revolution in opposition to Mubarak's presidency. Her name has been undisclosed, and therefore she cannot be properly identified. The image receives its title due to the fact that the woman was stripped of her abaya (a single full-body garment used to cover the body of a woman, aside from her face, hands and feet) while being dragged by Egyptian soldiers from the square, revealing her jeans, bare skin, and her blue bra. Such an event sparked widespread national and global reactions from individuals and the media.

Background
Civil unrest had spread across  Egypt due to much dissatisfaction with President Mubarak’s corrupt regime. Citizens protested by participating in demonstrations, marches, occupations, and civil disobedience in a national effort to overthrow Hosni Mubarak from the presidency. Many of the Egyptian grievances revolved around economic and political issues including unemployment, police brutality, political freedom, civil liberty, and food-price inflation. The use of mass media was instrumental into organizing collective action as people were able to utilize online social-networks to mobilize towards Tahrir Square. Such a strategy caught Mubarak’s regime by surprise, and therefore he was unable to efficiently contain or provide any successful counter strategy towards this social movement. On January 25, 2011, thousands gathered in Cairo any other Egyptian cities in opposition of the regime. Clashes between civilians and security forces unfolded in an attempt to halt the movement as some 840 people were killed, while over 6,000 were injured.

After a few weeks of continued protests and demonstrations, Vice President Omar Suleiman announced that Hosni Mubarak had resigned from the presidency, and would transfer state-control to the Supreme Council of the Armed Forces (SCAF). However, there were still many who were unsatisfied with the conditions and the obtainment of the government by the party of the SCAF. Many demanded for election reform, an end to the state of emergency, and for power to be returned to civilians. This sparked much outrage and controversy among Egyptian citizens. Therefore, this state of discontent led to a second wave of protests in Tahrir Square in December that same year.

The protest 
On December 17, 2011, many Egyptians occupied the Tahrir Square in order to protest and express their frustrations with the SCAF regime. However, the protests were met with resistance from the army, as civilians were beaten and arrested in an attempt by the regime to dispel the protests.

A video recorded from an aerial view then emerged of a woman trying to flee from the Square, only to stumble and fall to the ground. The security forces caught up to her and beat her severely. The soldiers began stomping her and hitting her with their batons. As they began dragging her away, her abaya fell from her body, revealing her stomach, jeans, and bra. The soldiers continued to stomp her body, though she seemed to be unconscious.

Reaction 
Following the publication of the video, many were morally outraged and disturbed by the actions of the SCAF. Popular media platforms such as CNN, NPR, and RT had all covered the event and video, resulting in a large viewing of, "The Girl in the Blue Bra". On December 20, 2011, thousands of activists gathered in Tahrir Square to condemn the actions of the military and the SCAF. Some observers claim that the protest consisted of one of the largest participation by women in a demonstration in recent years. Recognized political leaders such as Hillary Clinton criticized the attacks on protesters and labeled the actions of the military as a degrading to women, the revolution, and Egypt. In response to Clinton's remarks, Mohamed Kamal Amr, Egypt's Foreign Minister, proclaimed that Egypt accepts no interference in its affairs. However, the SCAF later apologized to women for its actions asserted their respect for women and their rights.

Symbolism 
Police have been known to beat civilians, but to overtly beat an unarmed female in public signifies that it could happen to anyone. Graffiti and painted images of the Blue Bra have been prominent on the walls of Cairo. It symbolizes the social suffering of a nation, as other issues such as opposition to violence, military-rule, censorship, and stripping of people are all personal experiences of activists. Others contend that, "The Girl in the Blue Bra" identifies that women's bodies are subject to moral, cultural, and political views. Further, they claim that the presence of women protesting in Tahrir Square for democracy and social justice may undermine state control and patriarchal values.

References

External links 

https://www.youtube.com/watch?v=mnFVYewkWEY&bpctr=1430341841
https://www.facebook.com/pages/Blue-Bra-Girl/204247682993672

Egyptian Crisis (2011–2014)
Police brutality in Africa
Women's rights in Egypt
2011 in Egypt
Police brutality in the 2010s
Violence against women in Egypt